Eugen Burg (6 January 1871 – 17 April 1944) was a German actor. His daughter was Hansi Burg. Burg was a close friend of the actor Hans Albers.

Burg was born Eugen Hirschburg into a Jewish family, but later converted to Protestantism. He was banished from the film industry when the Nazi Party came to power in Germany. He later died in Theresienstadt concentration camp.

Selected filmography

 Robert and Bertram (1915)
 In the Castle by the Lake (1918)
 The Secret of Wera Baranska (1919)
 The Secret of the Scaffold (1919)
 A Night in Paradise (1919)
 Colonel Chabert (1920)
 The Black Panther (1921)
 Violet (1921)
 Fridericus Rex (1922)
 Circus People (1922)
 Marie Antoinette, the Love of a King (1922)
 The Island of Tears (1923)
 Old Heidelberg (1923)
 The Wonderful Adventure (1924)
 Gobseck (1924)
 The Third Squadron (1926)
 Wrath of the Seas (1926)
 Fadette (1926)
 Eyes Open, Harry! (1926)
 The Circus of Life (1926)
 A Modern Dubarry (1927)
 Rinaldo Rinaldini (1927)
 Dancing Vienna (1927)
 The Gypsy Baron (1927)
 His Greatest Bluff (1927)
 The Hunt for the Bride (1927)
 Queen of the Boulevards (1927)
 The Mistress (1927)
 Panic (1928)
 It Attracted Three Fellows (1928)
 Who Invented Divorce? (1928)
 Man Against Man (1928)
 Girls, Beware! (1928)
 The First Kiss (1928)
 The Adjutant of the Czar (1929)
 Dawn (1929)
 Ludwig II, King of Bavaria (1929)
 Yes, Yes, Women Are My Weakness (1929)
 The Copper (1930)
 The Ring of the Empress (1930)
 1914 (1931)
 Mary (1931)
 My Leopold (1931)
 Elisabeth of Austria (1931)
 Der Herzog von Reichstadt (1931)
 The Daredevil (1931)
 Holzapfel Knows Everything (1932)
 Impossible Love (1932)
 The Pride of Company Three (1932)
 The Victor (1932)
 The White Demon (1932)

References

Bibliography
 Hardt, Ursula. From Caligari to California: Erich Pommer's Life in the International Film Wars. Berghahn Books, 1996.
 Kosta, Barbara. Willing Seduction: The Blue Angel, Marlene Dietrich, and Mass Culture. Berghahn Books, 2009
 Prawer, S.S. Between Two Worlds: The Jewish Presence in German and Austrian Film, 1910-1933. Berghahn Books, 2007.

External links

1871 births
1944 deaths
German male film actors
German male silent film actors
Male actors from Berlin
Jewish German male actors
German Protestants
German people who died in the Theresienstadt Ghetto
Converts to Protestantism from Judaism
19th-century German male actors
German male stage actors
20th-century German male actors